Walter da Rocha Tosta (20 October 1956 – 8 January 2023) was a Brazilian politician. A member of the Party of the Republic, he served in the Chamber of Deputies from 2011 to 2015.

Tosta died on 8 January 2023, at the age of 66.

References

1956 births
2023 deaths
Members of the Chamber of Deputies (Brazil) from Minas Gerais
Members of the Legislative Assembly of Minas Gerais
Liberal Party (Brazil, 2006) politicians
Politicians from Rio de Janeiro (city)